Szaszor, also known as Saszor, is a heraldic charge in the shape of headless eagle.

Usage 
It was used in the Orla and Saszow coat of arms of heraldic clans of Poland. It is also used in the coat of arms and flag of the municipality of Rędziny, Silesian Voivodeship, Poland.

Gallery

References

Bibliography 
 Alfred Znamierowski, Heraldyka i weksylologia. Arkady, 2017. ISBN 978-83-213-4972-5.
 Aleksander Brückner, Słownik etymologiczny języka polskiego, Kraków, Wydawnictwo	Krakowska Spółka Wydawnicza, 1927.

Polish heraldry
Heraldic eagles